Genevieve Camilleri is an Australian visual effects artist. She was nominated for an Academy Award in the category Best Visual Effects for the film Love and Monsters.

Selected filmography 
 Love and Monsters (2020; co-nominated with Matt Sloan, Matt Everitt and Brian Cox)

References

External links 

Living people
Place of birth missing (living people)
Year of birth missing (living people)
Visual effects artists
Visual effects supervisors